Year 1063 (MLXIII) was a common year starting on Wednesday (link will display the full calendar) of the Julian calendar.

Events 
 By place 

 Europe 
 May 8 – Battle of Graus: Allied Muslim and Christian troops, under King Sancho II (the Strong) and Emir Ahmad al-Muqtadir (maybe led by El Cid), defeat the Aragonese army. King Ramiro I is killed and succeeded by his son Sancho V, as ruler of Aragon.
 Battle of Cerami: Duke Roger I leads a small Norman force (supported by 136 mounted knights), and defeats a much larger Saracen army (35,000 men) at Cerami (near Troina) in Sicily.
 Summer – The Pisan fleet assaults and sacks Palermo (controlled by the Saracens) – this in support of the Norman forces of Roger I.
 August–September: The Holy Roman Empire invades Hungary and installs Solomon as their proxy ruler.
 Duke William I (the Bastard) claims the province of Maine and betroths his son Robert to Margaret, daughter of late Count Herbert II.

 Seljuk Empire 
 Battle of Damghan: Seljuk forces under Alp Arslan defeat his brother Qutalmish who claims the throne of late Tughril, founder of the Seljuk Empire. Qutalmish flees from the battle, but his son Suleiman is taken prisoner.

 By topic 

 Architecture 
 The Pizhi Pagoda located at Lingyan Temple (Shandong province) in China is completed, standing at a height of 54 m (177 ft) tall.
 Doge Domenico I orders the construction of the present building of St Mark's Basilica at Venice (approximate date).

 Religion 
 Anselm, later to become archbishop of Canterbury, becomes prior at the Abbey of Bec (approximate date).
 The bishopric of Olomouc (located on the River Morava) is founded (modern Czech Republic).

Births 
 Eight Deer Jaguar Claw (or 8 Deer), Mixtec ruler (d. 1115)
 Yuanwu Keqin, Chinese Chan Buddhist monk (d. 1135)

Deaths 
 March 21 – Richeza of Lotharingia, queen of Poland
 April 30 – Ren Zong, emperor of the Song Dynasty (b. 1010)
 May 8 – Ramiro I, king of Aragon (House of Jiménez)
 August 5 – Gruffydd ap Llywelyn, king of Gwynedd
 August 9 – Constantine III, Byzantine patriarch 
 September 3 – Henry II, archbishop of Augsburg
 September 4 – Tughril, sultan of the Seljuk Empire (b. 990)
 September 11 – Béla I (the Champion), king of Hungary
 December 7 – Qutalmish, prince of the Seljuk Empire
 Gotebald (or Gotebold), patriarch of Aquileia
 Hedwig (or Advisa), countess of Nevers
 Hilduin IV, count of Montdidier and Roucy
 Pang Ji, Chinese official and chancellor (b. 988)
 Sudislav Vladimirovich, prins of Pskov
 Sylvester III, pope of the Catholic Church

References